Pseudaonidiini is a tribe of armored scale insects.

Genera
Achorophora
Acontonidia

References

Aspidiotinae
Hemiptera tribes